David Ireland may refer to:

 David Ireland (artist) (1930–2009), American conceptual and installation artist
 David Ireland (author) (1927–2022), Australian novelist
 David Ireland (colonel) (1832–1864), Union Army colonel in the American Civil War
 David Ireland (playwright) (born 1976), Northern Irish-born playwright and actor